"Sanctuary" is the second single released by the British heavy metal band Iron Maiden. The single was released on 23 May 1980. Although originally issued as a non-album single, the song was added to the later US release of their debut studio record, Iron Maiden (1980). When the album was re-released in 1998, the song was added in all territories. In 1990, it was reissued on CD and 12" vinyl in The First Ten Years box set, in which it was combined with their first single, "Running Free".

History 
The original mix of the song was recorded in November 1979 and originally appeared on the 1980 Metal for Muthas compilation, featuring several other artists associated with the new wave of British heavy metal, which the band recorded as a four-piece with Doug Sampson on drums. Although the compilation was panned in Sounds, Iron Maiden's songs were praised, with their contributions being described as "raucous heavy metal/punk crossovers and tantalising tasters for their own forthcoming album."

Already a regular in the band's live set, the "Sanctuary" single was released on 7" vinyl on 16 May during the UK leg of the Iron Maiden Tour. This version of the song was recorded during the Iron Maiden album sessions, and, according to guitarist Dave Murray, "was ten times better than the original Metal for Muthas version." The b-side includes two live songs recorded at the Marquee Club in London on 3 April 1980 - "Drifter" (which would feature on the band's next album, Killers) and a cover of Montrose's "I've Got the Fire". The live version of "Drifter" includes a crowd interaction part where the audience is invited to follow the lead singer as he chants "Yo Yo Yo", which parodies The Police's "Walking on the Moon". The single performed even better than their debut, "Running Free", entering the UK Singles Chart at No. 33 before peaking at No. 29 a week later.

Although the song is credited to Iron Maiden, according to Metal Hammer contributor Dave Ling, the song was originally written by guitarist Rob Angelo, a member of the band in 1977 who was paid £300 for the song's rights. From 1998 onwards, the song was credited to Murray, bassist Steve Harris and singer Paul Di'Anno.

Artwork and controversy 
The cover art caused controversy for the band as it depicted their mascot, Eddie, wielding a knife while crouching over the corpse of then British prime minister Margaret Thatcher. The band's manager, Rod Smallwood, explained the artwork's concept: "The artwork is very tongue in cheek, as usual. At that time, Maggie had visited the old USSR and, following her tough stance with them, had been christened the Iron Maiden. Eddie took offence to this, and even more so when she started taking our posters." It was Smallwood himself who suggested to EMI that the cover be released with Thatcher's face censored "as this would give the tabloids an angle and draw attention to the single."

The attempt to gain coverage proved successful, with the Daily Mirror running a story about the single, as well as publishing the uncensored artwork, on 20 May under the headline: "It's murder! Maggie gets rock mugging." The Daily Record also published an article which deemed the cover "horrific", as well as included interviews with Young Scottish Conservatives who criticised the artwork of being "in very bad taste".

Margaret Thatcher also appeared on the band's next single, "Women in Uniform", in which she is shown seeking revenge on Eddie with a machine gun.

Track listing 
7" UK single

12" Dutch Single Personnel 
Production credits are adapted from the 7 inch vinyl cover.Iron MaidenPaul Di'Anno – lead vocals
Dave Murray – guitar
Dennis Stratton – guitar
Steve Harris – bass guitar
Clive Burr – drumsProduction'''
Wil Malone – producer, engineer
Derek Riggs – cover illustration

Chart performance

Running Free

Running Free / Sanctuary

Notes

References 

Iron Maiden songs
1980 singles
Songs about Margaret Thatcher
Songs written by Steve Harris (musician)
1980 songs
EMI Records singles
Obscenity controversies in music